Tainted is a 1987 American film written and directed by Orestes Matacena and starring Shari Shattuck. The film is a low-budget suspense drama about Cathy (Shattuck) a young school teacher married to the owner of a crematorium. It is centered on Cathy's attempt to cover-up the murder of an intruder who attempted to rape her. The cover up of the rape is due to the man that raped her being her ex-husband in the film.

Cast

References

1987 horror films
1987 films
1980s English-language films